Stuor Räitavagge is a valley in the Kebnekaise massif, in the Kiruna Municipality. It extends from Vistasvagge in the east to Tjäktjapasset in the west, being relatively wide and easy to travel through. There are no roads or marked pathways in it. In the middle of the valley, the Nallo mountain can be seen. The Swedish Tourist Association has a lodge in the base of the Nallo mountain.

References 

Valleys of Sweden
Kebnekaise